John McClure Wiley (August 11, 1841 – August 13, 1912) was a U.S. Representative from New York.

Biography
Born in Derry, Ireland, Wiley immigrated to the United States in 1850 with his parents, who settled in Erie County, New York. He attended the common schools, engaged in mercantile pursuits, and became active in the real estate business in Colden, New York.

A Democrat, He was a member of the New York State Assembly (Erie Co., 5th D.) in  1871 and 1872.  He served as delegate to the Democratic National Conventions in 1884, 1888, and 1892.

Wiley was elected as a Democrat to the Fifty-first Congress (March 4, 1889 – March 3, 1891).  He declined to be a candidate for renomination in 1890. In 1890 he married Virginia Emmeline Cooper (1858-1934), the daughter of John J. Cooper, who was Indiana State Treasurer from 1883 to 1887. Their son, John Cooper Wiley, was a career diplomat who served as U.S. ambassador to several foreign countries.

On April 24, 1893, President Grover Cleveland appointed Wiley to be U.S. Consul at Bordeaux, France, and he served until July 31, 1897.

After returning to the United States, Wiley resided in Jacksonville, Florida during the winter and Colden, New York during the summer.  In his later years his summer residence was in Washington, D.C.

Wiley died in St. Catharines, Ontario, Canada, August 13, 1912.  He was interred at Crown Hill Cemetery in Indianapolis, Indiana.

References

Sources

Newspapers

Books

External links

1841 births
1912 deaths
Irish emigrants to the United States (before 1923)
American people of Scotch-Irish descent
Burials at Crown Hill Cemetery
Democratic Party members of the United States House of Representatives from New York (state)
Democratic Party members of the New York State Assembly
People from Erie County, New York
19th-century American politicians